John Phillips Isenbarger (born December 5, 1947) is a former professional American football wide receiver in the National Football League.

Football career

College football
Isenbarger played college football at Indiana University.

Professional football
Isenbarger played four seasons for the San Francisco 49ers between 1970 and 1973. In 1974, he signed with the upstart World Football League and the Hawaiians where he had his best season as a pro. Playing as a Wide Receiver he caught 33 passes for 368 yards and 7 touchdowns. Following the 1974 season he retired from Pro Football.

References

1947 births
Living people
Sportspeople from Muncie, Indiana
Players of American football from Indiana
American football running backs
Indiana Hoosiers football players
San Francisco 49ers players
The Hawaiians players